Thomas Harold Gamboa (born February 28, 1948) is an American professional baseball coach and manager.

Gamboa has managed in the minor leagues as high as AAA (the Toledo Mud Hens in the  International League and the Albuquerque Dukes in the Pacific Coast League), and coached first and third base as well as in the bullpen for major league teams (the Chicago Cubs and Kansas City Royals). In September 2016, Gamboa was the bench coach for Israel at the 2017 World Baseball Classic qualifier, and he continued in the same role for Team Israel at the 2017 World Baseball Classic main tournament in South Korea and Japan.

Early and personal life
Gamboa was born in Los Angeles, California, and now lives in Rancho Mirage, California. He was raised by his mother, Polly, and his step-father (whose surname he took), Jack Donald Gamboa. Gamboa is fluent in Spanish. He has five children. His son Brett is an assistant professor of English at Dartmouth College.

He was drafted out of Notre Dame High School in Sherman Oaks, California, where he was a first baseman, by the Baltimore Orioles, but instead attended the University of California, Santa Barbara (B.A., History, 1971) on a full scholarship. There, he played primarily center field, along with a little first base, for the Gauchos baseball team for three years and won All-Big West Conference honors in 1969 and 1970.

Playing career
During the 1971–1972 seasons Gamboa was an outfielder for and manager of Stratford (Ontario) in the Canadian Baseball League, where he was a two-time All-Star.

Managing, scouting, and coaching career

Minor Leagues
Gamboa was a manager, minor league instructor, and scouting supervisor in the Milwaukee Brewers organization from 1978–1982. In 1979, at the age of 31, he managed the Butte Copper Kings in the Rookie Pioneer League. In 1983 he managed the Paintsville Brewers in the Rookie Appalachian League to a league-leading .653 won–loss percentage, and the league title. In 1984 he managed the Beloit Brewers in the Class A Midwest League to a Central Division-leading .619 won–lost percentage, and was voted Manager of the Year. In 1985 he managed the Stockton Ports in the Class A California League to a North Division-leading .566 won-loss percentage, and the Division championship.

In 1986 he managed the Bristol Tigers in the Appalachian League and served as the Detroit Tigers western states scouting director, and in 1987 he managed the Glens Falls Tigers in the AA Eastern League; both, affiliates of the Detroit Tigers. He was the minor league field coordinator for the Detroit Tigers from 1987–1990. He managed the Toledo Mud Hens in the AAA International League for the Detroit Tigers in 1990. He was the Director of Minor League Instruction for the San Diego Padres from 1991–94. He was the Chicago Cubs' Minor League Field Coordinator from 1995–1998.

In 2000, he managed the Dodgers' Albuquerque Dukes of the AAA Pacific Coast League to a Central Division-leading .597 won-lost percentage and title.

In 2005, he managed the Arkansas Travelers of the AA Texas League to the Texas League Eastern Division title for the Los Angeles Angels. In 2006 and 2007, he was Minor League Outfield/Baserunning Coordinator for the San Diego Padres. In 2009, he was the minor league field coordinator for the Padres.

In 2011, he managed the Inland Empire 66ers of the Class A+ California League (through June, when he resigned to spend time with his 85-year-old mother, who was terminally ill with advanced cancer), an affiliate of the Los Angeles Angels. That year he also played "Scout Martinez" in the Oscar-nominated 2011 baseball movie Moneyball.

During the 2012 California Winter League (Palm Springs, California), Gamboa served as the Field Coordinator.

From 2014 to 2016, he managed the Brooklyn Cyclones of the Short-Season A New York-Pennsylvania League, an affiliate of the New York Mets.

Major Leagues
From 1973–1975 he was a scout for the Baltimore Orioles, and from 1976–1977 he was a scout for the Major League Baseball Scouting Bureau.

He was the Chicago Cubs' first base and third base coach in 1998–1999.

Gamboa was a Major League coach for the Kansas City Royals from 2001–2003, serving as the bullpen coach in 2001 and 2003 and the team's first base coach in 2002. While he was the Royals first base coach, he was attacked on the field at Comiskey Park by two fans during a game against the Chicago White Sox on September 19, 2002. Gamboa suffered permanent hearing loss in his right ear.

International winter leagues
Gamboa managed the Indios de Mayagüez in Puerto Rico's Liga de Béisbol Profesional Roberto Clemente in seven winter league seasons from 1995–96 through 2002–03, reaching the finals in six seasons and winning three championships, managed in six Puerto Rican League All-Star games, and was named Manager of the Year following the 1995–96 and 1996–97 seasons. In 2002, he was inducted into the Association of Major League Legends of Latin America.

Gamboa managed Naranjeros de Hermosillo in the Liga Mexicana del Pacífico winter league in 2004.

Team Israel; World Baseball Classic
In September 2016, Gamboa was the bench coach for Israel at the 2017 World Baseball Classic qualifier. In an interview, he said he was serving as a Coach, due to his longtime friendship with manager Jerry Weinstein, and his knowledge of MCU Park (where the Qualifier was being played) even though he wasn't Jewish. He continued in a similar role for Team Israel at the 2017 World Baseball Classic main tournament in South Korea and Japan. During those games, Gamboa served as third base coach as well.

College league
In 2010, he managed the Palm Springs Power of the Southern California Collegiate Baseball League to a 34–4 mark, the best in team history.

Book
In 2018, he and David Russell co-wrote the autobiography Tom Gamboa: My Life In Baseball (McFarland), which sports columnist Mike Vaccaro of The New York Post described as "a fun read," and Lloyd Carroll of NY Sports Day described as "a fascinating look at a baseball professional who has spent as most of his life beating the bushes of baseball’s minor leagues." The book's foreword is written by baseball player Doug Glanville.

Minor league managing career
 
 Paintsville Brewers (1983)
 Beloit Brewers (1984)
 Stockton Ports (1985)
 Bristol Tigers (1986)
 Albuquerque Dukes (2000)
 Arkansas Travelers (2005)
 Palm Springs Power (2010)
 Inland Empire 66ers (2011) first half 
 Brooklyn Cyclones (2014–2016)

References

External links

1948 births
Living people
American male film actors
21st-century American non-fiction writers
Baseball coaches from California
Baseball players from Los Angeles
Baseball writers
Baltimore Orioles scouts
Brooklyn Cyclones managers
Chicago Cubs coaches
Kansas City Royals coaches
Major League Baseball bullpen coaches
Major League Baseball first base coaches
Major League Baseball third base coaches
Male actors from Los Angeles
People from Rancho Mirage, California
Sportswriters from California
UC Santa Barbara Gauchos baseball players
Violence in sports